William Brock (1 January 1851 – 9 February 1913) was an Australian politician.

Brock was born in Woodbank in Tasmania in 1825. In 1882 he was elected to the Tasmanian House of Assembly, representing the seat of Richmond. He served until 1885. He died in 1913.

References

1851 births
1913 deaths
Members of the Tasmanian House of Assembly